Williamia radiata nutata is a subspecies of small sea snail or saltwater limpet with a lung, a marine pulmonate gastropod mollusc in the family Siphonariidae, the marine pulmonate limpets.

References

 Powell A. W. B., New Zealand Mollusca, William Collins Publishers Ltd, Auckland, New Zealand 1979 
 Marshall B.A. (1981) The genus Williamia in the western Pacific (Mollusca: Siphonariidae). New Zealand Journal of Zoology 8: 487-492.

Siphonariidae